Thomas Christian Sadoski (born July 1, 1976) is an American stage, film, and television actor. He is best known for his roles as Don Keefer in the HBO series The Newsroom and as Matt Short in the sitcom television series Life in Pieces.

Early life and education
Sadoski was born in New Haven, Connecticut and raised in College Station, Texas. Sadoski attended the University of North Texas for one semester and graduated from the Circle in the Square Theatre School in 1998.

Career
Sadoski began his award-winning stage career as the understudy for Mark Ruffalo and Mark Rosenthal in the Off-Broadway production of Kenneth Lonergan's critically acclaimed play This is Our Youth at the Second Stage Theatre. It marked the first of many productions with the New York-based theatre company. He has appeared in many Broadway and Off-broadway productions as well as many productions in regional theaters. In 2008, he originated the role of Greg in Neil LaBute's play reasons to be pretty for MCC Theatre alongside The Newsroom co-star Alison Pill. After a critically lauded sold-out run Off-broadway, it transferred to Broadway in April 2009 where it earned three Tony Award nominations (Best Actor: Sadoski, Best Actress: Marin Ireland, Best Play) as well as three Drama Desk Award nominations (Best Actor: Sadoski, Best Director: Terry Kinney and Best Play), two Outer Critics Circle Award nominations (Best Actor: Sadoski, Best New Play), and three Drama League Award nominations (Best Play, Distinguished Performance Awards: Sadoski and Ireland). Neil LaBute credits Sadoski for inspiring the critically noted change in tone in reasons to be pretty from the playwright's earlier works saying: "His own thoughtfulness and good heart helped me to not fall back on anything that I had done before. My plays usually end darkly. I always thought that was real life, that there were always shades of gray, but he helped me see some other colors in the palette." In 2011, he originated the role of Trip Wyeth in Jon Robin Baitz's Other Desert Cities for which he won an Obie Award and Lucille Lortel Award. The play (which, also after a sold out Off-Broadway run, was transferred to Broadway in November 2011) was named Outstanding New Off-Broadway Play by the Outer Critics Circle in 2011. Sadoski has also been seen on Broadway alongside Ben Stiller, Edie Falco, Jennifer Jason Leigh and Alison Pill in John Guare's House of Blue Leaves.

Personal life 
Sadoski began dating actress Amanda Seyfried in early-2016. They confirmed their engagement on September 12, 2016. The couple married March 12, 2017. On March 24, 2017, it was announced that Seyfried had given birth to their daughter. In September 2020, Seyfried gave birth to their second child, a son.

Sadoski is a board member of the non-profit INARA. The organization helps displaced children get medical treatment they need, following injuries related to conflict. He is also an ambassador for the non-profit organizations War Child USA and War Child Canada, a member of the advisory board of the non-profit Fortify Rights  and a board member emeritus of the non-profit Refugees International.

Theatre credits

Filmography

Film

Television

Audio
In January 2011, Stephen King's audiobook recording of Mile 81 was released for which Thomas Sadoski was the narrator. AudioFile magazine said of his work: "Sadoski’s matter-of-fact narration of the monster's deeds makes the tale that much more unnerving to hear". Publishers Weekly agreed saying: "Thomas Sadoski provides smooth, matter-of-fact narration that acts as a counterpoint to the chilling and unnerving story line".

Awards and nominations

References

External links

Healy, Patrick, NY Times April 29, 2009
Lemon, Brendan, "Catching up with Thomas Sadoski" January 3, 2011

1976 births
20th-century American male actors
21st-century American male actors
American male film actors
American male stage actors
American male Shakespearean actors
American male television actors
American people of Polish descent
Audiobook narrators
Circle in the Square Theatre School alumni
Living people
Male actors from New Haven, Connecticut
Male actors from Texas
Obie Award recipients
People from College Station, Texas
University of North Texas alumni